Pablo Cimadevila Álvarez (born 12 December 1978) is an S6 swimmer from Spain. He competed at the 2000 Summer Paralympics, winning a gold in the 200 meter individual medley.  He competed at the 2004 Summer Paralympics, winning a bronze medal in the 4×50 meter medley relay 20 pts race. He competed at the 2008 Summer Paralympics, winning a bronze in the 200 meter individual medley  race and a bronze in the 4×50 m medley 20 points race. He competed at the 2012 Summer Paralympics, where he did not win a medal.

He was born in Pontevedra. In 2010, Cimadevila raced at the Tenerife International Open.

Cimadevila is a jewellery designer and jeweler. He has a brand called Kamikaze jewels. He has a YouTube channel with over 4.6 million subscribers, in which he posts videos demonstrating the making of his designs.

See also

References

External links 
 
 
 

1978 births
Living people
Spanish male medley swimmers
Paralympic swimmers of Spain
Paralympic gold medalists for Spain
Paralympic bronze medalists for Spain
Swimmers at the 2000 Summer Paralympics
Swimmers at the 2004 Summer Paralympics
Swimmers at the 2008 Summer Paralympics
Swimmers at the 2012 Summer Paralympics
Sportspeople from Pontevedra
Paralympic medalists in swimming
Medalists at the 2000 Summer Paralympics
Medalists at the 2004 Summer Paralympics
Medalists at the 2008 Summer Paralympics
S6-classified Paralympic swimmers